Rodrigo Nehme (born Rodrigo Vázquez Nehme; 22 August 1982 in Mexico City) is a Mexican actor known for his performance in the Mexican telenovela Rebelde as Nico Huber.

Rodrigo Nehme was born to a Mexican father, Jorge Vázquez Fernández Leal, and a Mexican mother of Lebanese descent, Monica Nehme El Azar. He was brought up in Guadalajara along with his older sister, where he studied in the American School Foundation of Guadalajara  (not to be confused with the American School Foundation  in Mexico City). Later on he lived in Ensenada, Baja California, He then returned to Mexico City where he discovered his true passion, acting. He started modeling at 16 years old doing commercials for TV. During that time, he was asked to host the cooking section of a TV program, and then he studied at the "Centro de Educación Artística"  (Artistic Education Center) in Mexico City. Nehme got his break by playing Nico, a Jewish teenager, in Rebelde, a highly successful Mexican series. He has also participated in several other programs produced by Televisa. 

He is currently the CBO for Grupo Once .

Filmography
El Club (2002) TV series, Host, Televisa
Rebelde (2004–06) TV series, Televisa
Celebremos México: Hecho en México (2005) TV program, Host, Televisa
Mujer, Casos de la Vida Real (2006) TV series, Televisa
Che-k-T-esto (2006) TV series, Host, Televisa
Cheetah Girls 2 (2006), TV movie, uncredited performer
AMD (2006) TV series, Televisa
Las Vecinas (2006) TV series, Jorvi Entertainment/USA
Mujer, La Serie (2007) TV miniseries, Televisa
Decisiones (2007) TV series, Telemundo/RTI
Estilos (2007) TV program, RCN/Colombia
Ugly Betty (2007) TV series, ABC/Televisa 
Maria de Todos Los Angeles (2008) TV series, Televisa

External links

1982 births
Living people
Mexican male television actors
Mexican male telenovela actors
Mexican people of Lebanese descent
Male actors from Mexico City
Male actors from Guadalajara, Jalisco
21st-century Mexican male actors